John Mackay is an Australian former professional rugby league footballer in the New South Wales Rugby League premiership. He played with Sydney club Eastern Suburbs in the years 1976, 1978–1979 and 1983–1988. He also played for the Newtown Jets from 1980 to 1982.

A Backrower, Mackay played in 94 first grade matches for Eastern Suburbs,  and 21 for the Newtown Jets club.

His son Shawn was a member of Easts Jersey Flegg (U21) winning side in the 2002 season. His son died 6 April 2009 from an infection following a motor vehicle accident.

References

 The Encyclopedia Of Rugby League Players (Alan Whiticker and Glen Hudson)

1956 births
Living people
Australian rugby league players
Sydney Roosters players
Newtown Jets players
Rugby league players from New South Wales